Cell is the tenth album by the Japanese rock group Plastic Tree.

Track listing

Plastic Tree albums
2004 albums